Jules Émile Planchon (21 March 1823 – 1 April 1888) was a French botanist born in Ganges, Hérault.

Biography 
After receiving his Doctorate of Science at the University of Montpellier in 1844, he worked for a while at the Royal Botanical Gardens in London, and for a few years was a teacher in Nancy and Ghent. In 1853 he became head of the department of botanical sciences at the University of Montpellier, where he remained for the remainder of his career.

Planchon was highly regarded in scientific circles, and made a number of contributions in his classification of botanical species and varieties. He is credited with publishing over 2000 botanical names, including Actinidia chinensis, better known as the "golden kiwifruit".

Planchon is remembered for his work in saving French grape vineyards from Phylloxera vastatrix, a microscopic, yellow aphid-like pest that was an exotic species from the United States. He performed this task with assistance from French botanist Pierre-Marie-Alexis Millardet and American entomologist Charles Valentine Riley. The solution involved introduction of American grapevines (Vitis riparia and Vitis rupestris) to France for grafting purposes. American horticulturalist, T.V. Munson, was instrumental in identifying and provisioning the American rootstock that was resistant to Phylloxera and suitable for French growing conditions.

Written works 
 Histoire botanique et horticole des plantes dites Azalées de l'Inde, 1854
 Des hermodactes au point de vue botanique et pharmaceutique, 1856
 Mémoire sur la famille des Guttiferes, 1862
 Le Phylloxéra (de 1854 à 1873) résumé pratique et scientifique, 1873
 Les mœurs du Phylloxéra de la vigne: résumé biologique, 1877
 Les vignes américaines: leur culture, leur résistance au phylloxéra et leur avenir en Europe, 1875
 Works in English:
 "On Meliantheae, a new natural order" proposed and defined by J. E. Planchon, 1848
 "The Eucalyptus globulus from a botanic, economic, and medical point of view, embracing its introduction, culture, and uses" 1875
 Writings about Jules Planchon:
 "The Botanist and the Vintner; How Wine Was Saved for the World", by Christy Campbell

References 

 Grande Encyclopédie (published around 1900); (biography of Jules Planchon)
 Parts of this article are based on a translation of the equivalent article from the French Wikipedia.

1823 births
1888 deaths
19th-century French botanists
People from Hérault
University of Montpellier people